The Carolina Raging Wolves were a team of the Women's Football Alliance that played from 2010 through 2012.  Home games were played on the campus of St. Pauls High School in St. Pauls, North Carolina, southwest of Fayetteville.

Season-By-Season

|-
|2010 || 0 || 8 || 0 || 4th National South Central || –
|-
|2011 || 1 || 7 || 0 || 2nd National Atlantic || –
|-
|2012 || 0 || 8 || 0 || 3rd National Southeast || –
|-
!Totals || 1 || 23 || 0
|colspan="2"|

2010

Season schedule

2011

Standings

Season schedule

2012

Season schedule

References

Carolina Raging Wolves website 
Women's Football Alliance website

Women's Football Alliance teams
American football teams in North Carolina
Sports in Fayetteville, North Carolina
Robeson County, North Carolina
American football teams established in 2010
American football teams disestablished in 2012
2010 establishments in North Carolina
2012 disestablishments in North Carolina
Women's sports in North Carolina